The modern pentathlon at the 1964 Summer Olympics  was represented by two events (both for men): Individual competition and Team competition. As usual in Olympic modern pentathlon, one competition was held and each competitor's score was included to the Individual competition event results table and was also added to his teammates' scores to be included to the Team competition event results table. This competition consisted of 5 disciplines:

Equestrian, held on October 11 at Asaka Nezu Park.
Fencing, held on October 12 at Waseda Memorial Hall. 
Shooting, held on October 13 at Asaka Shooting Range.
Swimming, held on October 14 at National Gymnasium.
Cross-country, held on October 15 at Kemigawa.

Medal table

Medal summary

Participating nations
A total of 37 athletes from 15 nations competed at the Tokyo Games:

Events

Individual competition

Team competition

References

External links
 
 

 
1964 Summer Olympics events
1964